Thammampatti Town Panchayat (also known as Dharma Nagar) is a Upgraded Special-Grade Town with a panchayat (local government) status in the Salem District of Tamil Nadu, India. The town is located between Pachamalai and the Kolli Hills on the River Swetha, and is known mainly for its fine wood carvings.

History
The region was ruled by several empires, including the three great empires – Chera, Chola and Pandyan, which shape the region's cuisine, culture, and architecture. After the fall of Kingdom of Mysore, the British Colonial rule during the modern period led to the emergence of Chennai, then known as Madras, as a metropolitan city. Modern-day Tamil Nadu was formed in 1956 after the reorganisation of states on linguistic lines. The state is home to a number of historic buildings, multi-religious pilgrimage sites, hill stations and three World Heritage Sites.

Population 
The pincode 636113 - Thammampatti falls in Salem district situated in Tamil Nadu state, with a population 35804. The male and female populations are 17944 and 17860 respectively. The size of the area is about 65.95 square kilometer.

Geography

Thammampatti is a plain situated between Pachamalai and the Kolli Hills with fertile alluvial soil. The River Swetha flows through this town and joins the River Vasista to form the River Vellar, which empty into the Bay of Bengal at Parangipettai (Port Novo).

Climate 
Tamil Nadu is mostly dependent on monsoon rains and so is prone to droughts when the monsoons fail. The climate ranges from dry sub-humid to semi-arid, and the state has two distinct periods of rainfall, the southwest monsoon from June to September and the northeast monsoon from October to December.

Since the state is entirely dependent on rains for recharging its water resources, monsoon failures lead to acute water scarcity and severe drought. Tamil Nadu is divided into seven agro-climatic zones: northeast, northwest, west, southern, high rainfall, high altitude hilly, and Kaveri Delta (the most fertile agricultural zone). Salem District and Thammampatti fall into the Northwestern Zone.

Demographics
Thammampatti had a voter population of 35,804 in 2020, with a total administration of approximately 7,000 households supplied with basic amenities. According to the religious census of 2020, Tamil Nadu had 87.58% Hindus, 6.12% Christians, 5.86% Muslims, 0.12% Jains and 0.3% following other religions or no religion.

Economics
The area's primary industry is agriculture, particularly the cultivation of tapioca.once tobacco industry flourished,Cigar made here is  exported to England for the use of Lords.Beedi(Indian cigarette) making gave  part time job once  to homemakers .  Wood carving artisan groups in the area of Gandhi Nagar (situated on the northwest side of the town) produce and export fine carvings both domestically to cities like Bangalore, Hyderabad, Mumbai and Kolkata and internationally to countries such as Singapore and Malaysia.

Culture
Tamil Nadu is known for its rich tradition of literature, art, music and dance which continue to flourish today. Tamil Nadu is also known for its monumental ancient Hindu temples and classical form of dance Bharata Natyam. Unique cultural features like Bharatanatyam (dance), Tanjore painting, and Tamil architecture were developed and continue to be practised in Tamil Nadu.

The town of Thammampattiis well known for Jallikattu, a bull-riding sport that is typically hosted by the District Collector of Salem.

Residents of the town celebrate Karthigai Deepam by lighting a large lamp on the mountain Thirumankaradu malai. The mountain is approximately 500 ft in height and is situated in the Northwest region of the town.

Religion 
 
  

Jamia Masjid (Bazaar Street) serves as a main mosque that hosts the special Friday noon prayers known as jumu'ah. This mosque also hosts the Eid prayers when there is no Masjed Farzad musalla or eidgah available or nearby. The term is rendered similarly in transliterations from other languages, such as jame mosque, jami masjid, jameh mosque, jamia masjid, or jomeh mosque.

Education

Tamil Nadu is one of the most literate states in India, andTamil Nadu has performed reasonably well in terms of literacy growth during the decade 2001–2011. A survey conducted by the industry body Assocham ranks Tamil Nadu top among Indian states with about 100 per cent gross enrolment ratio (GER) in primary and upper primary education, and an analysis of primary school education in the state by Pratham also shows a low drop-off rate.
Tamil Nadu has 37 universities, 552 engineering colleges 449 polytechnic colleges and 566 arts and science colleges, 34,335 elementary schools, 5,167 high schools, 5,054 higher secondary schools and 5,000 hospitals.

The population of Thammampatti has an average literacy rate of 66%, with a male literacy rate of 74% and a female literacy rate of 58%.

Tourism

The tourism industry of Tamil Nadu is the largest in India, with an annual growth rate of 16%. Tourism in Tamil Nadu is promoted by Tamil Nadu Tourism Development Corporation (TTDC), a government of Tamil Nadu undertaking. According to Ministry of Tourism statistics, 4.68 million foreign (20.1% share of the country) and 333.5 million domestic tourists (23.3% share of the country) visited the state in 2015, making it the most visited state in India by both domestic and foreign tourists. The state boasts some of the grand Hindu temples built-in Dravidian architecture, three of which have been declared as UNESCO World Heritage Sites.

Thammampatti features many architectural sites of note: Kasi Viswanathar  Temple,A Gaint Hanuman Statue,Sri Kannika Parameswari Amman Temple,Subramaniya Swamy Temple are in regional architecture and the Jamia Masjid (Bazaar Street) Mosque.

Kolli Hills (46 km above Thammampatti) and Pachamalai (42 km above Thammampatti), located in the western and eastern regions of Thammampatti respectively, are popular spots for hiking. Residents can travel to both locations via bus.The third Ghat road for Kolli Hills is via Valakombai with less hairpin bends.

Puliyancholai, a hamlet of about 30 families and 10-15 tea shops, is located nearby in the dense forest region of the same name in the foothills of Kolli Hills. Aagaya Gangai Falls and other wild streams are the source Aiyyaru flows through the hamlet.

Transport 
This is nearly 2.5 times higher than the density of all-India road network. The major road junctions are Chennai, Vellore, Madurai, Trichy, Coimbatore, Tiruppur, Salem, Tirunelveli, Thoothukudi, Karur, Kumbakonam, Krishnagiri, Dindigul and Kanniyakumari. Road transport is provided by state owned Tamil Nadu State Transport Corporation and State Express Transport Corporation. Almost every part of the state is well connected by buses 24 hours a day.
 
Thammampatti is well connected by bus transport via road to cities like Trichy, Namakkal, Karur, Madurai, Rasipuram, Erode, Kovai, Kallakurichi, Musiri, Kulithalai, Perambalur, Uppiliapuram, Thuraiyur, Samayapuram, Chennai, Vellore, Thiruvanamalai, Kolli hills, Seradi, Sendarapatti, Pachamalai, Bangalore, Vazhapadi, Attur and Salem. In addition to the main bus routes, minibuses play an important role in connecting villages within the hinterland. The nearest railway station is located in Attur (28 km), Thuraiyur (36 km), Trichy (79 km), Salem (59 km) and Rasipuram (40 km). The nearest airport is Tiruchirappalli International Airport, which offers both international and domestic flights and is approximately 85 km away from the town. the second closest airport, Salem Airport (87 km), offers domestic services only to Chennai.

Thammampatti is located on the border of 4 districts: Salem, Trichy, Namakkal, and Perambalur. It is located 59 km from the headquarter Salem, 79 km from Trichy, 65 km from Namakkal and 63 km from Perambalur.

TNSTC SALEM Division bus depot is having a Thammampatti branch (ATC Nagar).

List of areas in Thammampatti 

 Vannara Street
 Udayarpalayam
 Ulipuram
 Ulipuram Vembarasu
 Gandhi Nagar
 Indira Nagar
 Selva Nagar
 Valakkombai x road
 Koneeripatti
 Valakkombai Crossroad
 Jothi Nagar
 Pananthoppu
 Senkodi Nagar
 Sandai Pettai
 Palakkarai
 Aakragharam
 Nagiampatti Crossroad
 Sekkumedu
 Soappumandi
 ATC Nagar
 Thanner Pandhal
 Uppathukaadu
 Kongu Nagar
 Teachers Colony
 Thendral Nagar
 Valluvar Nagar (Selva Nagar)
 Selvapuram
 Seppalakkadu
 kurumbar Street
 Bazzer Street
 Middle Street
 Arunthathiyar Street

References

Cities and towns in Salem district